Josef Šenkýř (born 23 January 1937) is a Czech sailor. He competed in the Finn event at the 1980 Summer Olympics.

References

External links
 

1937 births
Living people
Czech male sailors (sport)
Olympic sailors of Czechoslovakia
Sailors at the 1980 Summer Olympics – Finn
Sportspeople from Zlín